Seton Hall University School of Law is the law school of Seton Hall University, and is located in downtown Newark, New Jersey. Seton Hall Law is the only private law school in New Jersey, and, according to the U.S. News & World Report rankings, is the top-ranked of the two law schools in the state. The school confers three law degrees: Juris Doctor, Master of Laws, and Master of Science in Jurisprudence. Founded in 1951, it is accredited by the American Bar Association (ABA), and is also a member of the Association of American Law Schools (AALS).

History
On February 5, 1951, Seton Hall University School of Law opened on the old John Marshall site, 40 Journal Square, Jersey City with an entering class of 72 students. The school was also fully accredited by the American Bar Association in the same year of its opening. Kathleen M. Boozang became Dean in 2015 succeeding Patrick E. Hobbs.

Seton Hall Law is the law school of Seton Hall University, which is located in South Orange, NJ. Seton Hall Law is located in Downtown Newark, NJ.

JD Programs
The J.D. degree program of 88 credits can be pursued as a full-time or a weekend student. Full-time students can complete the program in three years; weekend students can complete in four years or fewer if they accelerate their studies. Weekend students spend alternating weekends on campus each semester and engage in asynchronous online coursework while off-campus.

Other Degree Offerings
Seton Hall Law offers a Master of Science in Jurisprudence (M.S.J.) in Financial Services Compliance, Health and Hospital Law, Pharmaceutical and Medical Device Law and Compliance, Intellectual Property Law, or Privacy Law & Cyber Security.

A Master of Laws (LL.M.) is also offered with concentrations in Financial Services Compliance, Health Law, and Intellectual Property Law.

The school also offers several joint degree programs with other faculties of the University. For example, there is a combined J.D./M.A. (or MADIR) program with the University's Whitehead School of Diplomacy.

In Fall 2018, 250 students matriculated as 1Ls, a 25.62% increase over 2017. In 2017, 199 new students matriculated at the law school.

Admissions
For 2020, the entering class had an average LSAT score of 158 and average GPA of 3.55.

Centers
The Center for Health & Pharmaceutical Law & Policy educates lawyers and health care sector professionals regarding the complex set of laws that govern patients, health care providers, and life science companies.

The Institute for Privacy Protection educates consumers and businesses to provide inter-disciplinary forums to address emerging privacy issues by educating professionals, businesses, and organizations in this rapidly evolving area.

The Seton Hall Law Gibbons Institute of Law, Science & Technology educates and trains the next generation of attorneys and professionals for the complex issues they will face as scientific and technological advances challenge business, law, and legal institutions.

The Center for Social Justice is one of the nation's strongest pro bono and clinical programs, enabling students to gain hands-on experience while providing legal services to economically disadvantaged area residents.

The Center for Policy and Research provides law students with an uncommon opportunity to gain experience in forensic analysis and investigation through research into national policies and practices.

Ranking
In 2020, the U.S. News & World Report ranked the law school 59th in the nation. For the 2023 rankings, U.S. News & World Reports ranking of the school fell to 73rd. For 20 years, the school's health law program was ranked in the Top 10 by U.S. News & World Report.

In 2018, Above the Law (blog) ranked the law school 35th out of the top 50 law schools in the nation.

The National Law Journal ranked Seton Hall's 2017 graduating class as 1st in the nation for state and federal clerkships and 17th in the nation for employment.

Employment and bar passage 
Total employment rate for the Class of 2018 was 98%. Bar Pass required or J.D. Advantage totaled (94.3%). Employed students hold positions in Judicial Clerkships (58.23%), Private Practice (26.58%), Corporate or Business (6.96%), Government or Public Interest (6.33%), and 1.9% unemployed graduates are seeking employment.

Seton Hall Law's overall bar passage rate for first-time test takers in July 2019 was 94.26%.

Costs
The tuition and fees for Seton Hall University School of Law are $54,848 for incoming full-time students and $41,136 for incoming part-time students for the 2019–20 academic year. However, 81% of incoming students in 2018 received scholarship funding, and 75%-85% of funded students typically renew scholarships after the first year.

The median grant amount was $25,000 for full-time students and $19,400 for weekend students, bringing net-tuition (tuition less scholarship and grants) for those receiving the median grant amount to $27,206 for full-time students and $19,754 for weekend students.

Publications
The school produces two journals: Seton Hall Law Review and the Seton Hall Legislative Journal.

Campus

At One Newark Center, the Law School is housed in a 22-story building in Downtown Newark completed in 1991. The Newark Campus building provides  including  of library, named for Congressman Peter W. Rodino, Jr.. It is at the corner of Raymond Boulevard and McCarter Highway, two blocks west of Penn Station Newark, where numerous connections can be made to New Jersey Transit and PATH (an approximate 20 minute ride to Manhattan). While many students commute from around the New York metropolitan area, other students choose to reside at Eleven 80, the Union Building, and Renaissance Towers. One Newark Center is one of the tallest buildings in the city and also contains commercial offices. Nearby attractions include the New Jersey Performing Arts Center, Newark Museum, Prudential Center and Red Bull Arena.

Staff
The dean is Kathleen M. Boozang. On Nov. 9, 2022, the Office of the Provost announced that Boozang would be "stepping down as dean effective January 1, 2023 and returning to the faculty." John Kip Cornwell will serve as Interim Dean.

Notable alumni

Madeline Cox Arleo (J.D. 1989), federal judge for the United States District Court for the District of New Jersey
 Antonio Arocho (J.D. 1984), former executive director of the Hispanic National Bar Association
 Christopher Bateman (J.D.), New Jersey State Senator representing the 16th legislative district.
 John O. Bennett (J.D., 1974), former New Jersey State Senator and acting Governor.
 Craig Carpenito (J.D., 2000), former United States Attorney for the District of New Jersey.
 Dennis M. Cavanaugh (J.D., 1972), federal judge (retired) for the United States District Court for the District of New Jersey
 Michael Chagares (J.D., 1987), federal judge on the United States Court of Appeals for the Third Circuit
 Chris Christie (J.D., 1987), Governor of New Jersey, former United States Attorney for the District of New Jersey.
 Reed Gusciora (J.D., 1988), Mayor of Trenton, New Jersey and former New Jersey Assemblyman from 1996 to 2018.
 Clay Constantinou (J.D., 1981), former US Ambassador to Luxembourg from 1994 to 1999.
 Patrick J. Diegnan, (J.D.), New Jersey State Assemblyman representing the  18th legislative district and Parliamentarian of the New Jersey General Assembly
 Donald DiFrancesco (J.D., 1969), former Governor of New Jersey
 Michael J. Doherty (J.D. 1993), New Jersey State Senator representing the 23rd legislative district.
 Thomas W. Greelish (J.D., 1971), United States Attorney for the District of New Jersey from 1985 to 1987
 Katharine Sweeney Hayden (J.D., 1975), Federal judge for the United States District of New Jersey.
 Noel Lawrence Hillman (J.D., 1985), federal judge for the United States District Court for the District of New Jersey.
 Sean T. Kean (J.D.), New Jersey State Senator representing the 11th legislative district.
 John F. McKeon (J.D., 1983), New Jersey General Assembly and former mayor of West Orange, New Jersey.
 Mark McNulty (politician) (J.D., 1973), former Delaware Secretary of Transportation, who served in cabinet of Governor Dale E. Wolf
 Raj Mukherji (J.D. 2013), New Jersey State Assemblyman and former Deputy Mayor of Jersey City, New Jersey.
 Bart Oates (J.D.), three-time Super Bowl Champion and President of the New Jersey Hall of Fame
 Joel A. Pisano (J.D., 1974) retired federal judge for the United States District Court for the District of New Jersey (2000-2015)
 Anthony Principi (J.D., 1975), 4th United States Secretary of Veterans Affairs
 Richie Roberts (J.D., 1970), former detective and attorney responsible for the arrest and prosecution of Frank Lucas, portrayed by Russell Crowe in the film American Gangster
 Peter G. Sheridan (J.D., 1977) U.S. District Judge for the United States District Court for the District of New Jersey
 Michael A. Shipp (J.D. 1994) U.S. District Judge for the United States District Court for the District of New Jersey 
 Bob Smith (J.D.), New Jersey State Senator representing the 17th legislative district.
 Mark Sokolich (J.D.) — Mayor of Fort Lee, New Jersey
 Walter F. Timpone (J.D. 1979), former Associate Justice for the Supreme Court of New Jersey
 Shirley Tolentino (J.D., 1971), the first black woman to serve on New Jersey Superior Court and the first black woman appointed to the Jersey City Municipal Court and to serve as its presiding judge.
Paul Matey (J.D., 2001), federal judge on the United States Court of Appeals for the Third Circuit

See also
Lists of law schools
Post-secondary education in New Jersey
Rutgers School of Law-Newark
Rutgers School of Law–Camden

References

External links
Seton Hall University School of Law
Seton Hall Law Campus Virtual Tour

 
Educational institutions established in 1951
Law schools in New Jersey
Law schools in the New York metropolitan area
Catholic universities and colleges in New Jersey
Education in Newark, New Jersey
Universities and colleges in Essex County, New Jersey
Universities and colleges in Newark, New Jersey
Catholic law schools in the United States
1951 establishments in New Jersey